The 1897–98 international cricket season was from September 1897 to April 1898. The season consists with a single international tour where AE Stoddart's XI toured Australia for The Ashes.

Season overview

December

England in Australia

References

International cricket competitions by season
1897 in cricket
1898 in cricket